Daniel Vidal Fuster (born 30 December 1975 in Burriana, Castellón) is an S6 swimmer from Spain.  He competed at the 2000 Summer Paralympics. He finished first in the 50 meter butterfly race, the 4 x 50 meter medley relay and the 4 x 50 meter freestyle relay race. He finished second in the 50 meter freestyle race.  He raced at the 2004 Summer Paralympics. He finished second in the 50 meter freestyle race.  He finished third in the 50 meter butterfly race and the 4 x 50 meter medley relay.  He raced at the 2008 Summer Paralympics. He finished second in the 4 x 50 meter freestyle relay race. He finished third in the 4 x 50 meter medley relay. He finished fourth in the 50 meter freestyle race.  He finished fifth in the 50 meter butterfly race.

At the 2009 IPC  European Swimming Championship in Reykjavík, Iceland, Vidal finished in the top three in at least one of his races. In 2010, he raced at the Tenerife International Open.

References

External links 
 
 

Spanish male freestyle swimmers
Spanish male butterfly swimmers
Living people
1975 births
Paralympic gold medalists for Spain
Paralympic silver medalists for Spain
Paralympic bronze medalists for Spain
Sportspeople from Castellón de la Plana
Swimmers at the 2000 Summer Paralympics
Swimmers at the 2004 Summer Paralympics
Swimmers at the 2008 Summer Paralympics
Paralympic medalists in swimming
Medalists at the 2000 Summer Paralympics
Medalists at the 2004 Summer Paralympics
Medalists at the 2008 Summer Paralympics
Paralympic swimmers of Spain
S6-classified Paralympic swimmers
Medalists at the World Para Swimming Championships